Free Laptop Distribution scheme : मुफ्त लैपटॉप वितरण योजना -: This is an initiative of the Government of Uttar Pradesh headed by Akhilesh Singh Yadav of Samajwadi Party to provide  for laptops and computer tablets to the students in the state who pass the high school and intermediate examinations to encourage them for higher studies. A total of 15 Lakh laptops have been distributed by the Government of Uttar Pradesh between 2012-2015, making it one of the largest distribution scheme ever imitation by any Government in the world.

History
This scheme was first introduced by Samajwadi Party in its 2012 Assembly Election manifesto to give free laptops and tablet computers to intermediate and high-school pass outs of 2012 by Akhilesh Yadav. After becoming the Chief Minister of Uttar Pradesh he distributed 15 lakh laptops under this scheme in first three years of his administration. In the year 2015 Government announced to gift free laptops to toppers of each district in Uttar Pradesh. 625 High School Class and 425 Intermediate Toppers of session 2014-2015 will be benefitted. Between 2012-16 there are nearly 1607000+ laptop distributed where as in single year in 2013 980000+ laptop distributed among student in Uttar Pradesh which is also a record.

Purpose and Benefits of the Scheme
Uttar Pradesh Government’s free laptop scheme was aimed at bridging the digital divide and empowering the youths of the state. The students who were lagging behind due to lack of resources benefited under this scheme.

The beneficiaries as per the decision taken by the state cabinet were students who passed 10th and 12th exams conducted by the following bodies.
Uttar Pradesh Secondary Education Board
CBSE, ICSE and ISC
Poorva Madhyama and Madhyama of Sanskrit Education Board
Munshi/Maulvi and Alim of Madrasa Board
Recognized ITI and Polytechnics

20% quota for minorities and 21% for SC/CT students was also made in the final Free Laptop Distribution Scheme recipients list. This scheme was considered as one of the visionary approach of socialist government to provide an equal opportunity and to remove discrimination. Youth activist Ravi Nitesh views it as an effort where students in Uttar Pradesh received laptop at a time when many youths were not even able to see a computer. It is believed that through these laptop distribution, students would receive inspiration towards higher education and interest in studies with easiness of resource materials in soft copies and editing of their notes at a time when in India, enrolment in higher education (around 25%) was much lower than many countries (China 43%, USA 85%) and hence there was a strong need to frame policies that may encourage students to study, develop interest and understanding and getting enrolled for higher education.

Configuration Details
The configuration details of the laptops provided by Hewlett-Packard(HP)

References
7. https://www.business-standard.com/article/economy-policy/up-govt-approves-rs-2-800-cr-laptop-scheme-113012400092_1.html Business Standard Retrieved 2022-10-05

8. https://indianexpress.com/article/india/uttar-pradesh/up-budget-no-funds-for-akhileshs-free-laptop-scheme/ The Indian Express Retrieved 2022-10-05

9. https://economictimes.indiatimes.com/nation-world/up-cm-akhilesh-yadav-launches-free-laptop-scheme-for-students/slideshow/18907278.cms The Economic Times Retrieved 2022-10-05
Government schemes in Uttar Pradesh